Paul Randolph Coffman (born March 29, 1956) is an American former professional football player who was a tight end for ten seasons for the Green Bay Packers, Kansas City Chiefs, and Minnesota Vikings in the National Football League (NFL). After attending high school in Chase, Kansas, he walked on to Kansas State University where he played tight end for four years. After completing college Coffman became an undrafted free agent and joined the Green Bay Packers.

Personal life
His son, Chase, was an all star tight end for the University of Missouri and last played with the Indianapolis Colts until he was released in 2016. His son, Carson, was the starting quarterback for Kansas State University in the 2010 season and most recently played arena football. His third son, Cameron, is transferring from the Indiana University Hoosiers to the University of Wyoming. His only daughter, Camille, is attending the University of Wyoming on a full scholarship for volleyball.

References

External links
NFL.com player page
Packers Hall of Fame bio (archived page, 2011)

1956 births
Living people
Players of American football from St. Louis
American football tight ends
Kansas State Wildcats football players
Green Bay Packers players
Kansas City Chiefs players
Minnesota Vikings players
National Conference Pro Bowl players